Prisoners of Love is a lost 1921 American silent drama film produced by and starring Betty Compson and distributed by Goldwyn Pictures. It was directed by Arthur Rosson and was Compson's first film after a year's hiatus from film making.

Cast
 Betty Compson as Blanche Davis
 Ralph Lewis as Her Father
 Claire McDowell as Her Mother
 Emory Johnson as James Randolph
 Kate Toncray as His Mother
 Roy Stewart as Martin Blair

References

External links

 Prisoners of Love at IMDb.com
 Synopsis; Prisoners of Love at allmovie.com

1921 films
American silent feature films
Lost American films
Films directed by Arthur Rosson
Goldwyn Pictures films
American romantic drama films
1921 romantic drama films
American black-and-white films
Lost romantic drama films
1920s American films
Silent romantic drama films
Silent American drama films